Maxime Boudreault (born 21 September 1991) is a Canadian professional strongman competitor from Kapuskasing, Ontario. He secured 3rd place in the 2021 World's Strongest Man competition in Sacramento, California and won the inaugural 'Magnús Ver Magnússon Strongman Classic' competition in 2021 in Iceland.

Personal records
Squat –  (2022 Arnold Strongman Classic)
Deadlift –  (2017 Arnold Series Qualifier)
Log press –  (2021 World's Strongest Man)
Axel press –  (2019 Giants Live North American Open)

References

Living people
1991 births
Canadian strength athletes